Giasuddin Quader Chowdhury is a Bangladesh Nationalist Party politician and a former Jatiya Sangsad member from Chittagong-6 and Chittagong-7 constituencies.

Career
Chowdhury's candidacy in the 2008 election was cancelled by the returning officer of Bangladesh Election Commission as a court order that cleared him a loan defaulting case did not reach the commissions office before the deadline.

In November 2009, Chowdhury's residence was attacked allegedly by Awami League activists.

On 20 May 2010, Chowdhury collected nominations papers to contest the Chittagong City Corporation mayoral elections. In September 2010, an arrest warrant was issued against him and his brother, Saifuddin Quader Chowdhury, on a bad check case.

Two of Chowdhury's followers were lynched by a mob when they were fleeing after shooting a local Jubo League leader on 24 October 2013.

Chowdhury is a vice chairman of the Bangladesh Nationalist Party as of August 2016. He is the former President of Chittagong District (north) unit of Bangladesh Nationalist Party. He is a director of QC Container Line Ltd and QC Shipping Ltd, both of which are family-owned companies. He is also a director of Dacca Dyeing.

On 3 June 2018, Chowdhury secured bail in two cases, one over threatening Prime Minister Sheikh Hasina and another over vandalizing cars, from the High Court Division.

On 30 October 2019, Chowdhury was sentenced to three years imprisonment for making derogatory comments about Prime Minister Sheikh Hasina. He went on the run after securing a bail from the High Court Division.

Personal life
Chowdhury's father, Fazlul Quader Chowdhury, was the speaker of the parliament of Pakistan. His brother, Salauddin Quader Chowdhury, was a former member of parliament and convicted war criminal. He has three other brothers, and Salman F. Rahman is his cousin.

References

Living people
Bangladesh Nationalist Party politicians
Bangladeshi businesspeople
3rd Jatiya Sangsad members
7th Jatiya Sangsad members
Year of birth missing (living people)
Place of birth missing (living people)